Stephenson High School (SHS) is a public school that serves grades 9–12 in the unincorporated area of DeKalb County, Georgia, United States. It has a Stone Mountain postal address but it is not in the city limits. It is part of the DeKalb County School District.

Stephenson High School is in the old historic area near Stone Mountain. The main campus is five acres. The school has an enrollment of 1,571 students.

Facility and curriculum
SHS has a 500-seat theatre equipped with two full-size dressing rooms, computer-operated lights and backdrops, an orchestra pit with hydraulic lift, and a catwalk. The Atlanta Theatre Organ Society donated and installed an organ with full piping. Stephenson is one of three schools in the country to house such an organ, and uses it for musicals and concerts.

Students study horticulture, landscaping, and botany in an outdoor classroom which includes a waterfall and two greenhouses.

The school offers a broadcast and media production curriculum. The program components include JAG 8 News, SHS's television station; Jaguar Enterprises, which shoots, edits and produces programs for community members; and Jaguar Records, a recording label.

Notable alumni

 Alade Aminu - basketball player, older brother of NBA forward Al-Farouq Aminu, 2015–16 Israel Basketball Premier League rebounding leader
 Andre' Anderson - former NFL player, Detroit Lions
 Joanna Atkins - Olympic track and field sprinter
 Marcus Ball - former NFL player, New Orleans Saints, Carolina Panthers 
 Reggie Ball - former NFL player for Detroit Lions and Georgia Tech quarterback
 Anthony Cannon - former NFL player, Detroit Lions
 Jermaine Cunningham - former NFL player, New York Jets
 Mike Davis - NFL player, Atlanta Falcons, Carolina Panthers
 Fast Life Yungstaz - hip-hop group
 Bruce Irvin - NFL player, Seattle Seahawks 
 J.I.D - Rapper
 Gail Bean - Actress
 Dontell Jefferson - former NBA player, Charlotte Bobcats
 Shaun Jolly - NFL players, Cleveland Browns, Los Angeles Rams
 Kenny Ladler - NFL player, New York Giants, Washington Commanders
 Lloyd - R&B singer
 Kregg Lumpkin - former NFL player, Green Bay Packers
 DeMario Minter - former NFL player, Cleveland Browns
 Perry Riley - former NFL player, Washington Commanders
Chauncey Rivers - NFL player, Green Bay Packers
 Roderick Rogers - former NFL player, Denver Broncos
 Kelvin Sheppard - former NFL player and current coach, Detroit Lions
 Ronnie Shields - former NFL player, Seattle Seahawks
 Preston Smith - NFL player, Washington Commanders and Green Bay Packers
 Montez Sweat - NFL player, Washington Commanders
 D. J. Wonnum - NFL player, Minnesota Vikings

References

External links

1996 establishments in Georgia (U.S. state)
Educational institutions established in 1996
DeKalb County School District high schools